EP is the third release from the U.S. indie rock band The Fiery Furnaces. It is 41 minutes in length, and is arguably not an EP, but rather a short LP, and thus a proper album.

It is a collection of the material written by the band between the release of their first and second albums. It contains tracks from the band's first three singles (with the exception of "Crystal Clear") and two new tracks.

Track listing

References

2005 compilation albums
The Fiery Furnaces albums
B-side compilation albums
Rough Trade Records compilation albums